Mikhail Yuryevich Barshchevsky (born 27 December 1955) is a Russian jurist who serves as the plenipotentiary representative of the Government of the Russian Federation in the Constitutional Court and the Supreme Court of the Russian Federation.

He was the chairman of the High Council for the Civilian Power party in 2007–2008.

References
Government of the Russian Federation

1955 births
Living people
Lawyers from Moscow
Echo of Moscow radio presenters
Russian liberals
Civic Platform (Russia) politicians
21st-century Russian politicians
1st class Active State Councillors of the Russian Federation
Kutafin Moscow State Law University alumni
Recipients of the Order "For Merit to the Fatherland", 4th class
Recipients of the Order of Honour (Russia)